Wao Airport (Maranao/Iranun: Landing a Wao) is an airport serving the general area of Wao, located in the province of Lanao del Sur, Philippines. The Civil Aviation Authority of the Philippines classifies this recently constructed (ca. 2015) facility as a community airport.

As of 2016 the airport has only been used for a few private flights.

References

Airports in the Philippines
Buildings and structures in Lanao del Sur